This is a list of Swedish television related events from 2016.

Events
14 May - The 61st Eurovision Song Contest is held at the Ericsson Globe in Stockholm. Ukraine wins the contest with the song "1944", performed by Jamala.
20 May - Country and pop singer Elisa Lindström and her partner Yvo Eussen win the eleventh season of Let's Dance.

Debuts

Television shows

2000s
Idol (2004-2011, 2013–present)
The Scandinavian version of Big Brother (2005-2006, 2014–present)
Let's Dance (2006–present)
Talang Sverige (2007-2011, 2014–present)

Ending this year

Births

See also
2016 in Sweden

Deaths

References